Let It Go is a debut studio album by American DJ and producer House Shoes, released on June 19, 2012 via Tres Records. It featured guest appearances by the likes of Black Milk, Chali 2na of Jurassic 5, Danny Brown, Fatt Father & Marv Won of the Fat Killahz, Gangrene, Guilty Simpson & Hex Murda of Almighty Dreadnaughtz, Roc Marciano, and more. The record is available as double CD album, vinyl and digital download.

Critical reception 

At Metacritic, which assigns a normalized rating out of 100 to reviews from mainstream publications, the album received a score of 69, based on 5 reviews. Patrick Taylor of RapReviews praised the album saying, "Most of Let It Go is solid, but there are some skippable tracks". Adam Finlay of PopMatters said, "The result is a more cohesive album than most tight rap collectives". Del F. Cowie of Exclaim! said, "If J. Dilla has been Detroit hip-hop's most influential recent figure, then DJ HouseShoes is the stern, no-frills custodian of that legacy, known to regulate violators and opportunists circling the music James Yancey created". Marcus J. Moore of BBC said, "Excessive interludes drag the runtime and make the project feel a bit unfocused – but these missteps don’t subtract too much from the overall premise".

Track listing

Personnel 
Michael Buchanan – producer
Scott "Tenacity" Martin – audio mixing
Eric Coleman – photography

References

External links

2012 albums